Poison Arrows is the first full-length album by San Francisco indie rock band Communiqué.

Track listing
 "The Best Lies"  – 2:29
 "Evaporate"  – 3:30
 "Ouija Me"  – 2:58
 "Dagger Vision"  – 3:32
 "Perfect Weapon"  – 3:16
 "Black Curses"  – 3:38
 "Strays"  – 4:04
 "My Bay"  – 4:38
 "Death Rattle Dance"  – 3:56
 "Rattling Bones"  – 7:41

References

2004 albums
Communiqué (band) albums